Caribbomerus mexicanus is a species of beetle in the family Cerambycidae. It was described by Napp and Martins in 1984.

References

Graciliini
Beetles described in 1984